Lola and Mila is a Serbian animated television series created by Sergej Ćetković and produced by Studio Carousel and Event Media Production. The show focuses on the adventures of two little girls Lola and Mila, named after Sergej's daughters. As they spend their time exploring new things, they fall into situations that are entertaining but educational as well.

Production
Sergej Ćetković together with spouse Kristina Ćetković and other team members started the work on this project in 2017. During the year, they finished the picture book What is Sweeter than a Cake, used as a basis for children's educational animated program.

International broadcast
The first season contained of 10 episodes, with airing started on May 21, 2018. on Pikaboo channel.

References

External links
 
 

Animated characters
Child characters in television
Serbian animated television series
2018 Serbian television series debuts
Fictional Serbian people